Growth Associated Protein 43 (GAP43) is a protein encoded by the GAP43 gene in humans.

GAP43 is called a "growth" or "plasticity" protein because it is expressed at high levels in neuronal growth cones during development and axonal regeneration, and it is phosphorylated after long-term potentiation and after learning.

GAP43 is a crucial component of the axon and presynaptic terminal. Its null mutation leads to death within days after birth, due to axon pathfinding defects.

Synonyms 
GAP43 is also referred to as:
 protein F1
 neuromodulin
 neural phosphoprotein B-50
 axonal membrane protein GAP-43
 calmodulin-binding protein P-57
 nerve growth-related peptide GAP43
 neuron growth-associated protein 43

Function 
GAP43, is a nervous tissue-specific cytoplasmic protein that can be attached to the membrane via a dual palmitoylation sequence on cysteines 3 and 4. This sequence targets GAP43 to lipid rafts. It is a major protein kinase C (PKC) substrate and is considered to play a key role in neurite formation, regeneration, and plasticity.  The role of GAP-43 in CNS development is not limited to effects on axons: It is also a component of the centrosome, and differentiating neurons that do not express GAP-43 show mislocalization of the centrosome and mitotic spindles, particularly in neurogenic cell divisions. As a consequence, in the cerebellum, the neuronal precursor pool fails to expand normally and the cerebellum is significantly smaller.

Several different laboratories studying the same protein, now called GAP43, initially used different names. It was designated F1, then B-50, then GAP43, pp46, and finally neuromodulin, each name reflecting a different function of the same molecule. F1 was localized to synapses, and was increased in its phosphorylation one day after learning. However, F1 was not cAMP kinase dependent. B-50 was regulated by the pituitary peptide ACTH and was associated with grooming behavior.  In the case of GAP-43, it was designated as a growth-associated protein because its synthesis was upregulated during axonal regeneration.  Pp46 was concentrated in neuronal growth cones and was thus postulated to play an important role in brain development.  In the case of neuromodulin, it was shown to bind calmodulin avidly.

GAP43, the consensus choice for its designation, is a nervous system-specific protein that is attached to the membrane via a dual palmitoylation sequence on cysteines 3 and 4, though it can exist in the non-bound form in the cytoplasm. This dual sequence enables the association of phosphatidylinositol-4,5-bisphosphate [PI(4,5)P2] or PIP2, with actin,  facilitating the latter's polymerization thereby regulating neuronal structure.  This can occur within a lipid raft so as to compartmentalize and localize motility of filopodia in growth cones in developing brains, and could also remodel presynaptic terminals in adults in an activity-dependent manner. GAP-43 is also a protein kinase C (PKC) substrate.  Phosphorylation of serine-41 on GAP-43 by PKC regulates neurite formation, regeneration, and synaptic plasticity.

Because of the association and potential binding of GAP43 with a number of different molecules, including PKC, PIP2, actin, calmodulin, spectrin, palmitate, synaptophysin, amyloid and tau protein,  it may be useful to think of GAP43 as an adaptor protein situated within the terminal in a supramolecular complex regulating presynaptic terminal functions, particularly bidirectional communication with the postsynaptic process.   Its important role in memory and information storage is executed through its cell biological mechanisms of phosphorylation, palmitoylation, protein-protein interaction and structural remodeling via actin polymerization.

Clinical significance 

Humans with a deletion in one allele of the GAP43 gene fail to form telencephalic commissures and are intellectually disabled.

Model organisms

Model organisms have been used in the study of GAP43 function. A conditional knockout mouse line, called Gap43tm1a(EUCOMM)Wtsi was generated as part of the International Knockout Mouse Consortium program—a high-throughput mutagenesis project to generate and distribute animal models of disease to interested scientists. Male and female animals underwent a standardized phenotypic screen to determine the effects of deletion. Twenty five tests were carried out on mutant mice and two significant abnormalities were observed. No homozygous mutant mice survived until weaning. The remaining tests were carried out on heterozygous mutant adult mice and increased IgG1 levels were observed in these animals.

Studies on another homozygous GAP43 knockout mouse line found it to be lethal days after birth because it plays a critical role in the development of the mammalian CNS.  Telencephalic commissures fail to form, thalamocortical afferents are mistargeted, especially in somatosensory, particularly barrel, cortex. GAP43 is not only important for axon targeting during development but it has been shown to be important also for the maintenance of the structure and dynamics of axonal fibres and of their synaptic terminals in wild-type rodents both during normal conditions and during lesion-induced axonal sprouting. The cerebellum is also affected. GAP43 is also haploinsufficient for the cortical phenotypes and the severity of the axon targeting phenotype is directly related to the extent to which the affected axons are phosphorylated by PKC, suggesting that axons require a functional threshold of phosphorylated GAP43 for targeting to occur normally. Moreover, elevation above this threshold in GAP43 mice can enhance learning and also facilitate a physiological model of learning, long-term potentiation (LTP). However, further enrichment beyond a certain level can be devastating to cognitive functions.

References

Further reading

External links 
 
 ihop-net, Growth associated protein 43
 NCBI

Genes mutated in mice